Major Dudley Cautley Stewart-Smith  (12 October 1894 - 8 June 1957) was a British barrister and a Deputy Judge Advocate. He also served as a Councillor on the Calcutta Municipal Corporation and as a member of the State Council of Ceylon.

Dudley Cautley Stewart-Smith was born on 12 October 1894 in Cheshire, the eldest son of Sir Dudley Stewart-Smith and Katherine née Cautley. He studied at the University College, Oxford.

Stewart-Smith received a call to the bar by the Middle Temple on 17 November 1916.

He initially enlisted with the Royal Fusiliers (City of London Regiment) and in December 1914 was transferred as a 2nd Lieutenant to the 3rd Battalion Black Watch (Royal Highlanders). In January 1916 Stewart-Smith saw action in the Battle of Hanna.

He married Phyllis née Luson in London in 1923, they had three children: Phyllis Jean (b.1925 Calcutta), Priscilla (b.1931 Colombo) and Geoffrey (b.1933 Colombo).

In 1924 he served as a Councillor on the Calcutta Municipal Corporation.

In 1932 he succeeded T. L. Villiers as the nominated member of the 1st State Council of Ceylon.

On 8 September 1939 he was appointed as a Deputy Judge Advocate, a position he held until he retired in 1955. Between 1946 and 1947 he served as one of the members of the War crimes tribunal in Hamburg, after the end of World War II.

Stewart-Smith died on 8 June 1957 in Weybridge, Surrey.

References

Further reading 

1894 births
1957 deaths
Royal Fusiliers soldiers
People from Cheshire
Alumni of University College, Oxford
Members of the Middle Temple
Black Watch officers
British Army personnel of World War I
War Office personnel in World War II
English barristers
Members of the Order of the British Empire
Members of the 1st State Council of Ceylon
20th-century English lawyers
Military personnel from Cheshire